The British Association for International and Comparative Education (BAICE) is a learned society in the United Kingdom dedicated to promoting teaching, research, policy and development in all aspects of international and comparative education. It is a member of the Academy of Social Sciences. The association runs an academic journal, Compare.

The current Chair of BAICE is Dr Tejendra Pherali from the Institute of Education, UCL. The current Vice chair is Dr Alison Buckler from The Open University. The current Secretary is Dr Jennifer Jomafuvwe Agbaire from the Centre for International Education (CIE) at the University of Sussex. The current President of BAICE is Professor Paul Morris from the Institute of Education, UCL.

External links

References

Learned societies of the United Kingdom
Scientific organisations based in the United Kingdom
Academic organisations based in the United Kingdom
Social sciences organizations
Scholarly communication